Uh Oh or variants may refer to:

Books 
 Uh-Oh: Some Observations from Both Sides of the Refrigerator Door, a book by Robert Fulghum
 Uh! Oh! (children's book series), a children's book series about Jewish holidays

Television 
 Uh Oh! (game show), a Canadian children's show
 "Vacation" or "the 'uh-oh' episode", an episode of the TV series Sealab 2021

Brands 
 Uh-Oh! Oreo, a type of Oreo cookie

Music

Albums 
 Uh-Oh (Cowboy Mouth album), or the title song
 Uh-Oh (David Byrne album)

Songs 
 "Uh-Ohhh!", a song by Ja Rule featuring Lil Wayne
 "Uh-Oh" (song), by (G)I-dle
 "Uh Oh", song by Kelly Osbourne from her 2005 album Sleeping in the Nothing
 "Uh Oh", song by Taken by Cars
 "Uh Oh", song by TQ
 Uh Oh… No Breaks!, an album by The Slickee Boys
 "Mama Do (Uh Oh, Uh Oh)", a song by Pixie Lott
 "Never Leave You (Uh Oooh, Uh Oooh)", a song by Lumidee
 "Uh Oh" (Chinese and English version), song by Chloe Bennet
 "Uh Oh", a song by post-grunge band Puddle of Mudd from their 2019 album Welcome to Galvania

See also 
 Oh No (disambiguation)